Speyeria edwardsii, the Edwards' fritillary,  is a butterfly of the family Nymphalidae of North America. It is common from Alberta west to Manitoba and south as far as northern New Mexico.
 
This butterfly is mostly orange coloured with distinct dark-brown bars on the topside. The wing margins are dark with lighter circles then darker crescents. Silvery spots predominate on the yellowish underside.

Larva feeds on Viola nuttallii.

Similar species
Great spangled fritillary – S. cybele
Callippe fritillary – S. callippe

References 

Speyeria
Butterflies of North America
Butterflies described in 1866
Taxa named by Tryon Reakirt